Clickbait is a text or a thumbnail link that is designed to attract attention and to entice users to follow that link and read, view, or listen to the linked piece of online content, being typically deceptive, sensationalized, or otherwise misleading. A "teaser" aims to exploit the "curiosity gap", providing just enough information to make readers of news websites curious, but not enough to satisfy their curiosity without clicking through to the linked content. Clickbait headlines often add an element of dishonesty, using enticements that do not accurately reflect the content being delivered.
The "-bait" suffix makes an analogy with fishing, where a hook is disguised by an enticement (bait), presenting the impression to the fish that it is a desirable thing to swallow.

Before the Internet, a marketing practice known as bait-and-switch used similar dishonest methods to hook customers. In extreme degree, like bait-and-switch, clickbait is a form of fraud. (Click fraud, however, is a separate form of online misrepresentation which uses a more extreme disconnect between what is being presented in the frontside of the link versus what is on the click-through side of the link, also encompassing malicious code.) The term clickbait does not encompass all cases where the user arrives at a destination that is not anticipated from the link that is clicked.

Definition 
A defining characteristic of clickbait is misrepresentation in the enticement presented to the user to manipulate them to click onto a link. While there is no universally agreed-upon definition of clickbait, Merriam-Webster defines clickbait as "something designed to make readers want to click on a hyperlink, especially when the link leads to content of dubious value or interest." Dictionary.com states that clickbait is "a sensationalized headline or piece of text on the Internet designed to entice people to follow a link to an article on another web page."

BuzzFeed editor Ben Smith states that his publication avoids using clickbait, using a strict definition of clickbait as a headline that is dishonest about the content of the article. Smith notes that Buzzfeed headlines such as "A 5-Year-Old Girl Raised Enough Money To Take Her Father Who Has Terminal Cancer To Disney World" deliver exactly what the headline promises. The fact that the headline is written to be eye-catching is irrelevant in Smith's view since the headline accurately describes the article.

Facebook, while trying to reduce the amount of clickbait shown to users, defined the term as a headline that encourages users to click, but does not tell them what they will see. However, this definition excludes a lot of content that is generally regarded as clickbait.

A more commonly used definition is a headline that intentionally over-promises and under-delivers. The articles associated with such headlines often are unoriginal, and either merely restate the headline, or copies content from a more genuine news source.

The term clickbait is sometimes used for any article that is unflattering to a person. In such cases, the article is not actually clickbait by any legitimate definition of the term.

Background

From a historical perspective, the techniques employed by clickbait authors can be considered derivative of yellow journalism, which presented little or no legitimate well-researched news and instead used eye-catching headlines that included exaggerations of news events, scandal-mongering, or sensationalism. One cause of such sensational stories is the controversial practice called checkbook journalism, where news reporters pay sources for their information without verifying its truth. In the U.S. it is generally considered an unethical practice, as it often turns celebrities and politicians into lucrative targets of unproven allegations. According to Washington Post writer Howard Kurtz, "this thriving tabloid culture has erased the old definitions of news by including tawdry and sensational stories about celebrities for the sake of profit."

Use 
Clickbait is primarily used to drive page views on websites, whether for their own purposes or to increase online advertising revenue. It can also be used for phishing attacks for the purpose of spreading malicious files or stealing user information. The attack occurs once the user opens the link provided to learn more. Clickbait has also been used for political ends and has been blamed for the rise of post-truth politics. Katherine Viner, editor-in-chief at The Guardian wrote that "chasing down cheap clicks at the expense of accuracy and veracity" undermined the value of journalism and truth. Emotional subjects with stark headlines are widely shared and clicked, which resulted in what Slate described as an "aggregation of outrage" and a proliferation of websites across the political spectrum – including Breitbart News, Huffington Post, Salon, Townhall and the Gawker Media blogs – which profited by producing shareable short-form pieces offering simple moral judgements on political and cultural issues.

Click-through rates (CTRs) on YouTube show that videos with hyperbolic or misleading title, created for the purpose of being attention-grabbing, displayed higher amounts of click-through rates than that of videos which did not. Clickbait tactics generally lead to higher clickthrough rates, and to higher revenue and optimization of a content creator's overall engagement.

There are various clickbait strategies, including the composition of headlines of news and online articles that build suspense and sensation, luring and teasing users to click. Some of the popular approaches in achieving these include the presentation of link and images that are interesting to the user, exploiting curiosity related to greed or prurient interest. It is not uncommon, for instance, for these contents to include lewd image or a "make money quick" scheme.

Clickbait is also used in abundance on streaming platforms that thrive with targeted-ads and personalization. At the International Consumer Electronics Show, YouTube revealed that most of the videos watched and watch-time generated did not come from Google searches, but from personalized advertisements and the recommendations page. Recommendations on YouTube are driven by a viewers personal watch history and videos that get an abundance of clicks. With a streaming platform like YouTube, which has upwards of 30 million active users a day, the videos that are watched are very likely to be that with clickbait in either the title or thumbnail of the video, garnering attention and therefore clicks.

Backlash

By 2014, the ubiquity of clickbait on the web had begun to lead to a backlash against its use. Satirical newspaper The Onion launched a new website, ClickHole, that parodied clickbait websites such as Upworthy and BuzzFeed, and in August 2014, Facebook announced that it was taking technical measures to reduce the impact of clickbait on its social network, using, among other cues, the time spent by the user on visiting the linked page as a way of distinguishing clickbait from other types of content. Ad blockers and a general fall in advertising clicks also affected the clickbait model, as websites moved toward sponsored advertising and native advertising where the content of the article was more important than the click-rate.

Web browsers have incorporated tools to detect and mitigate the clickbait problem while social media platforms such as Twitter have implemented algorithms to filter clickbait contents. Social media groups, such as Stop Clickbait, combat clickbait by giving a short summary of the clickbait article, closing the "curiosity gap". Clickbait reporting browser plug-ins have been also developed by the research community in order to report clickbait links for further advances in the field based on supervised learning algorithms. Security software providers offer advice on how to avoid harmful clickbait.

See also

 Outrage porn
 Rage farming
Rickrolling

References

External links

  - Profile page

Deception
Internet terminology
Technology neologisms
News media manipulation
Pejorative terms